Robert Earl Long is an American former professional baseball pitcher. He had two separate stints in the Major League Baseball (MLB), four years apart.

External links
, or Retrosheet, or Pura Pelota (Venezuelan Winter League)

1954 births
Living people
All-American college baseball players
American expatriate baseball players in Canada
Baseball players from Tennessee
Buffalo Bisons (minor league) players
Calgary Cannons players
Charleston Patriots players
Charlotte O's players
Chattanooga Lookouts players
Greenville Braves players
Major League Baseball pitchers
Navegantes del Magallanes players
American expatriate baseball players in Venezuela
Niagara Falls Pirates players
People from Jasper, Tennessee
Pittsburgh Pirates players
Portland Beavers players
Richmond Braves players
Rochester Red Wings players
Salem Pirates players
Salt Lake City Gulls players
Seattle Mariners players
Shorter Hawks baseball players
Texas A&M Aggies baseball players